James William Wood (born 8 March 1893) was a professional footballer, who played for South Shields, Huddersfield Town and Blackpool. While at Huddersfield he won the 1921–22 FA Cup and the 1922 FA Charity Shield.

References

1893 births
English footballers
Footballers from Sunderland
Association football defenders
English Football League players
South Shields F.C. (1889) players
Huddersfield Town A.F.C. players
Blackpool F.C. players
Year of death unknown
FA Cup Final players